David Valter (born 7 January 1970 in Přílepy) is a Czech sport shooter. He competed at the 1992 Summer Olympics in the mixed skeet event, in which he tied for 21st place.

References

1970 births
Living people
Skeet shooters
Czech male sport shooters
Shooters at the 1992 Summer Olympics
Olympic shooters of Czechoslovakia
People from Rakovník District
Sportspeople from the Central Bohemian Region